Rai Jagat Bahadur Singh  (died 15 February 1878) was the ruler of princely Bhadri state of Oudh. After the murder of Rai Jagmohan and his son Bishnath by Nazim at Ramchaura Ghat on the bank of Ganges, Bhadri was then given to Amarnath Singh, nephew and adopted son of Rai Jagmohan Singh, who was succeeded by his adopted son, Jagat bahadur Singh, whose father Sheoratan Singh, was hanged at Allahabad in 1857.
Jagat Bahadur Singh also died without issue, and adopted Rai Sarabjit Singh, who received the hereditary title of Rai from the British government in November 1879.

See also 
 Pratapgarh Estate
 Bhadri

References

People from Pratapgarh, Uttar Pradesh
19th-century Indian monarchs
1878 deaths
Year of birth missing